Jaesin Lee (Korean: 이재신, born January 21, 1975) is a South Korean composer of opera, chamber music, orchestral and film music.

Education 
 Hochschule für Musik Franz Liszt, Weimar, Germany – diploma

Life and career

List of works

Operas 
(2021) Jeom-rye and Young-ja
(2018) 1953
(2016) Tale of Kerberos

Music drama 
(2012) Comfort after 145 years
(2009) Eclipse

Art songs 
(2021) 정든님 가니
(2020) Arirang of Nostalgia
(2020) 한강
(2016) 개를 여라믄이나 기르되
(2010) 꽃사슴 뛰노는 청와대
(2009) 바람위의 여의도
(2008) 명동성당에서

Choral 

 (2020) Han river Arirang

Orchestral 
(2007) Violin concerto
(2003) Concert for 2 Groups

Chamber music 
(2017) String Quartet No. 3
(2016) "Han river (Han ghang)" for violin and 2 percussionists
(2015) String Quartet No. 2 'Sewol'
(2014) String Quartet No. 1
(2011) Nuance for flute viola and piano
(2010) Kyrie for mixed voice, flute and piano
(2004) Trio for horn, piano and percussion
(2003) "Ja oder Nein" for harp, cello, percussion and piano
(2002) "The story of night" for clarinet, cello and percussion
(2001) Drei Stücke für 2 Schlagzeuger
(2001) Composition for 5 instruments

Solo 
(2013) "Croquis" No. 3 for piano
(2012) "Croquis" No. 2 for piano
(2009) "Croquis" No. 1 for piano
(2008) "Elegy" for violin
(2004) "Road Music" for flute solo
(2003) Horizon for accordion
(2002) Piano sonata

Tape and electronic compositions 
 (2003) "Stimmung" for stereo tape

Film scores 
Image Concerto (2017)
Black Stone (2015)
Black Dove (2011)
Land of Scarecrows (2008)
The Last Dining Table (2006)]

Discography

Land of Scarecrows original sound track

Black shadow 
 Black shadow
 Sorrow
 Subic Waltz
 Fantasy

Luna story 
 Autumn Moon
 Soul Flower Waltz
 Eclipse
 Waltz of Moon

The Story of the Girl (Comfort Women) 

 That girl]
 Black sea]
 The story of the girl]

etc 
 Bitter, Blue Desire
 Hola Incheon Tango
 Black Shadow
 연극 마분지 신부 original sound track

Books 
 The Study of Opera and Art Song (2020)
Filmmusic (2014), revised 2016

References

External links 
 
 
 
 
 
 
 영화음악론 [Filmmusic] by Jaesin Lee, 2014, riss.kr

1975 births
Living people
South Korean opera composers
South Korean film score composers
South Korean expatriates in Germany